V. Krishnasamy (13 January 1948 – 2 August 2020) was a Malaysian footballer.

A prison officer by profession (as Malaysia football is not professional at his time), Krishnasamy represented Prison Department, Penang FA and Perak FA during his football career. He also played for Malaysia national team, and competed in the men's tournament at the 1972 Summer Olympics.

In 2004, he was inducted in Olympic Council of Malaysia's Hall of Fame for 1972 Summer Olympics football team.

References

1948 births
2020 deaths
Malaysian footballers
Malaysia international footballers
Olympic footballers of Malaysia
Footballers at the 1972 Summer Olympics
Place of birth missing
Malaysian people of Tamil descent
Malaysian sportspeople of Indian descent
Association football midfielders
Prison officers